Pauley is an unincorporated community and coal town in Pike County, Kentucky, United States. Their post office is closed. It was also known as Panley.

References

Unincorporated communities in Pike County, Kentucky
Unincorporated communities in Kentucky
Coal towns in Kentucky